"All the Rage Back Home" is a song by American rock band Interpol. It is the first track and the lead single from the band's fifth studio album, El Pintor (2014) and was digitally released on August 12, 2014. Self-produced and written by the band, the song debuted at No. 37 on the Billboard Alternative Songs chart, peaking at No. 26. The song was also made available as downloadable content for the Rock Band series.

Rolling Stone described the song as "anxious, atmospheric post-punk".

Music video
The music video for "All the Rage Back Home", co-directed by Sophia Peer and the band's lead singer, Paul Banks, was released on July 9, 2014. It shows the band performing the song in a dark room intercut with footage of surfers challenging waves. The black-and-white video also features Banks on bass guitar, which he occasionally performed with since the departure of bassist Carlos Dengler in 2010.

Track listing

7" vinyl
Soft Limit — SOFTLIMIT02

Digital download

Personnel
Interpol
Paul Banks vocals, guitar, bass guitar, production
Daniel Kessler guitar, piano, production
Sam Fogarino drums, percussion, production

Guest musicians
Brandon Curtis keyboards

Other personnel
James Brown engineering, recording
Alan Moulder mixing
Greg Calbi mastering

Charts

Release history

References

External links
 

2014 singles
Interpol (band) songs
2014 songs
Matador Records singles
Black-and-white music videos
Post-punk songs
Songs written by Paul Banks (American musician)
Songs written by Sam Fogarino
Songs written by Daniel Kessler (guitarist)